East Sharpsburg is an unincorporated community and census-designated place (CDP) in Blair County, Pennsylvania, United States. It was first listed as a CDP prior to the 2020 census.

The CDP is in southern Blair County, in central Taylor Township.

East Sharpsburg sits in the western part of Morrisons Cove, at the southern base of Loop Mountain. Plum Creek runs through the community, flowing northwest to Halter Creek at McKee Gap, where the creeks form a water gap between Dunning Mountain and Short Mountain, exiting Morrisons Cove. Halter Creek continues to the Frankstown Branch of the Juniata River, part of the Susquehanna River watershed.

Demographics

References 

Census-designated places in Blair County, Pennsylvania
Census-designated places in Pennsylvania